Monte Alto Independent School District is a public school district based in the community of Monte Alto, Texas (USA). The district has three campuses - Monte Alto Early College High School (Grades 9-12),  Monte Alto Middle School (Grades 6-8) and Monte Alto Elementary School (Grades PK-5).

As of 2007, the Texas State Energy Conservation Office awards Monte Alto ISD money due to the colonias served by the district.

In 2009, the school district was rated "recognized" by the Texas Education Agency.

References

External links
 

School districts in Hidalgo County, Texas